Wrangle Hill is an unincorporated community in New Castle County, Delaware, United States. Wrangle Hill is located at the intersection of U.S. Route 13, Delaware Route 7, and Delaware Route 72 west of Delaware City. The community was named after a feud between two early families.

References

External links

Unincorporated communities in New Castle County, Delaware
Unincorporated communities in Delaware